Yle X3M ([ekstrẹ:m], Radio Extrem) is a Finnish Swedish-language radio station, owned and operated by Yle. It is generally aimed at the youth audience, and the target audience is 15- to 30-year-olds. It was established in 1997.

In 1998, X3M became one of the first Finnish radio stations with an online broadcast.

The studios of Yle X3M are located in Helsinki and Vaasa.

Programmes

Weekdays
Succémorgon
Jouren
Stiftelsen
Bumerang
Metallrepubliken (Mondays)
Rytmrepubliken (Tuesdays)
Rockrepubliken (Wednesdays)
Poprepubliken (Thursdays)
Äntligen fredag (Fridays)
Hovet

Weekends
Veckoslutskommittén
Sedlighetens vänner (Saturdays)
Önska (Saturdays)
Cirkus Kiev (Sundays), produced by Sveriges Radio P3
X3M Live (Sundays)

Sister channels within Nordvision
Finland: YleX (Finnish-language)
Sweden: Sveriges Radio P3
Norway: NRK P3
Denmark: DR P3
Iceland: Rás 2

External links
Official website

Yle radio stations
Radio stations established in 1997